Latchford Barracks is an Australian Army base in the suburb of Bonegilla, located about  to the east of Wodonga, Victoria. It is named after Colonel E.W. Latchford, MBE, MC (1889–1962). The barracks is host to the Army Logistic Training Centre. The Bonegilla Migrant Reception and Training Centre was located at the barracks, prior to the barracks being reused for military purposes.

Torture video
In November 2021, the ABC reported an incident of "bastardisation" of a RAAF recruit in 2020. Video of the incident showed the recruit being tied up and tortured by another serviceman. Police reportedly found that "a criminal offence could not be determined at the time". The recruit, now retired, claims that the incident has destroyed him.

Notes

References

Barracks in Australia